The Ministry for the Environment and Natural Resources is an Icelandic cabinet-level ministry founded 23 February 1990. It was originally called the Ministry for the Environment but was renamed to its current name on 1 September 2012. The Ministry oversees a wide range of matters as they relate to the environment, including nature conservation, wildlife protection, forest protection and revegitation efforts, environmental impact assessment and land use planning, pollution control and environmental health, fire prevention, meteorology, and mapping, including surveying and remote sensing. The current Minister for the Environment and Natural Resources is Guðmundur Ingi Guðbrandsson.

Departments 
The Ministry for the Environment and Natural Resources of Iceland comprises six departments:

 Department of Climate Action
 Department of Environment and Spatial Planning
 Department of Finance and Administration
 Department of Land and Natural Heritage
 Department of the Permanent Secretary
 Department of Policy Coordination and International Affairs

Agencies 

 Icelandic Meteorological Office (Veðurstofa Íslands)
 Environment Agency of Iceland (Umhverfisstofnun)
 Iceland Construction Authority (Mannvirkjastofnun)
 Icelandic Forest Service (Skógrækt ríkisins)
 Iceland GeoSurvey (Íslenskar orkurannsóknir)
 Icelandic Institute of Natural History (Náttúrufræðistofnun Íslands)
 Icelandic National Planning Agency (Skipulagsstofnun)
 Icelandic Recycling Fund (Úrvinnslusjóður)
 Institute of Freshwater Fisheries (Veiðimálastofnun)
 Myvatn Research Station (Náttúrurannsóknastöðin við Mývatn)
 National Land Survey of Iceland (Landmælingar Íslands)
 State Soil Conservation Service (Landgræðsla ríkisins)
 Stefansson Arctic Institute (Stofnun Vilhjálms Stefánssonar)
 Vatnajökull National Park (Vatnajökulsþjóðgarður)

See also 
 Environment and Transport Committee

References

External links 
  
  

1990 establishments in Iceland
Iceland
Environment of Iceland
Environment
Iceland, Environment and Natural Resources
Iceland